Lac du Fioget is a lake at Châtelneuf in the Jura department of France.

Fioget

This is also the birthplace of Etunde